Kapioma Township is a township in Atchison County, Kansas, United States. As of the 2010 census, its population was 292.

History
Kapioma Township was named for a chief of the Kickapoo Indians.

Geography
According to the USGS, it contains two cemeteries: Earnst and Miller.

The streams of Catamount Creek, Elk Creek, Nebo Creek, Negro Creek and Straight Creek run through this township.

Transportation
Kapioma Township contains one airport or landing strip, Strafuss Airport.

References
 USGS Geographic Names Information System (GNIS)

External links
 US-Counties.com
 City-Data.com

Townships in Atchison County, Kansas
Townships in Kansas